James Reginald Colley (May 24, 1880 – November 8, 1968) was a Canadian politician. He served in the Legislative Assembly of British Columbia from 1924 to 1928  from the electoral district of Kamloops, as a Liberal.

He was the mayor of Kamloops from 1923-1924

References

1880 births
1968 deaths
British Columbia Liberal Party MLAs
Mayors of Kamloops
Politicians from Yorkshire
20th-century Canadian legislators